Oscar Kahl (born 17 October 1997) is a Thai footballer who plays as a defender or midfielder.

Career
Before the 2017 season, Kahl signed for Thai side Bangkok United after playing for the youth academy of AIK, one of the most successful clubs in Sweden.

Before the 2021 season, he signed for Thai top flight team Rayong after playing for Ranong United in the Thai second division.

Personal life
He is the brother of footballer Eric Kahl.

References

External links
 

Living people
Swedish footballers
Oscar Kahl
Swedish people of Thai descent
Oscar Kahl
Oscar Kahl
Oscar Kahl
1997 births
Association football defenders
Association football midfielders